The Cocorobó Area of Relevant Ecological Interest is an area of relevant ecological interest in the state of Bahia, Brazil.

Location

The Cocorobó Area of Relevant Ecological Interest is in the municipality of Jeremoabo, Bahia.
It is in the caatinga biome.
The area is just north of highway BR-235.
The Riacho do Cipó, a tributary of the Vaza-Barris River, flows through the western half of the area from north to south.

History

The Cocorobó Area of Relevant Ecological Interest was created on 5 June 1984.
Its objectives are to maintain a natural ecosystem of regional or local importance and regulate use to conserve nature.
The area is administered by the Chico Mendes Institute for Biodiversity Conservation (ICMBio).
It became part of the Caatinga Ecological Corridor, created in May 2006.

Notes

Sources

Areas of relevant ecological interest of Brazil
Protected areas of Bahia
1984 establishments in Brazil